Catherine Davydzenka (born 2 May 1998), is a French actress.

Childhood and beginnings 
Catherine Davydzenka started acting at the age of 11. At the age of 12, she was spotted by Matthieu Gautier who offered her a role in his film Les raclures.

Career 
In 2020, she joined the cast of the daily series Ici tout commence, broadcast on TF1. Besides acting, Davydzenka is also a model. She is chosen as a model for Yves Saint-Laurent and Franck Provost. She participates in the Fashion Week.

Private life 
She is of Belarusian origin.

Filmography

Television 
 2015 : Les raclures: Olga
 2017 : Like Me (Disney Channel)
 2020 : Le bureau des légendes
 Since 2020: Ici tout commence : Hortense Rochemont

Cinema 
 2018: Mon bébé by Liza Azuelos
 2019 : La Vérité si je mens les débuts

References

External links 
 
 

1998 births
21st-century French actresses
21st-century French women
Living people